Marina Khan (born 26 December 1962) is a Pakistani television and film actress, director and a producer. She was one of the most popular actresses of the 1980s and 1990s. Her television shows include Tanhaiyan (1986), Dhoop Kinare (1987), Kohar (1991), Nijaat (1993), Tum Se Kehna Tha (1995) and Tanha (1997). She left industry in mid 2000s and again made a comeback from Tanhaiyan Naye Silsile (2012) which was the sequel to her debut series Tanhaiyan of 1986. Khan made her film debut with titular role in 2016 movie Lala Begum.

Early life and family
Khan was born in Peshawar, KPK province of Pakistan. Her father Rehmat Khan came from a Pashtun family from Tank district, Dera Ismail Khan, while her mother Anna Rehmat was of English descent but settled in Peshawar. She is the granddaughter of Nawab of Tank Nawab Qutubdin Khan Her father worked for the Pakistan Air Force and the family had to relocate almost every two years depending upon his job assignment. So she said in an interview, as a result of this situation, that she did not have long-term childhood friends.

Acting career
Marina Khan made her debut in a PTV drama in honor of Rashid Minhas Shaheed, Pakistan's national hero from the Indo-Pakistan War of 1971. Later, she received her real breakthrough from the drama serial Tanhaiyaan in 1985. "Marina Khan rose to fame with Tanhaiyaan, which became a tremendous hit amongst Pakistani audiences." However, later Marina took up directing and production as parts of her profession and also had her own cooking show.

Khan is currently settled in Karachi also remains the goodwill representative of World Wide Fund for Nature (WWF). She hosted the show Marina Mornings (2007–08) on ARY Digital. In 2016 she appeared in Mehreen Jabbar's short film Lala Begum. The film was premiered at Mosaic International South Asian Film Festival on 6 August 2016 under the Zeal for Unity banner. She later made a cameo appearance in Punjab Nahi Jaongi (2017) and appeared in reoccurring roles in Na Maloom Afraad 2 (2018), and Parwaaz Hai Junoon (2018). In the same year she appeared in Mehreen Jabbar's Eid telefilm Hum Chale Aaye. As for television, Khan is currently active in Urdu television industry being appeared in various television dramas. Her most recent appearances includes Jackson Heights (2014), Kaif-e-Baharan (2018), Noor-ul-Ain (2018), Qaid (2018), Dil Kiya Karey (2018), Bandish (2019) and Aulaad (2020–21).

Filmography

Film

Selected television work

Reality shows

Awards and recognition

See also
 List of Pakistani actresses

References

External links
 

1962 births
Living people
Pashtun women
People from Peshawar
Pakistani television actresses
Pakistani television directors
Pakistani television producers
Pakistani people of English descent
Actresses from Karachi
20th-century Pakistani actresses
21st-century Pakistani actresses
Women television producers
Women television directors
Nigar Award winners